The black-and-white becard (Pachyramphus albogriseus) is a species of bird in the family Tityridae. It has traditionally been placed in Cotingidae or Tyrannidae, but evidence strongly suggest it is better placed in Tityridae, where it is now placed by the South American Classification Committee. It is found in Colombia, Costa Rica, Ecuador, Panama, Peru, and Venezuela. Its natural habitats are subtropical or tropical dry forests and subtropical or tropical moist montane forests.

References

Pachyramphus
Birds described in 1857
Taxonomy articles created by Polbot